Telorchis clemmydis is a species of flukes in the genus Telorchis found in Asian freshwater turtles, mainly of the family Geoemydidae.

Host species 
 Mauremys japonica (gall bladder and intestines)
 Cuora amboinensis (intestine)
 Heosemys grandis (intestine)
 Mauremys reevesii (intestine)
 Orlitia borneensis (intestine)

References

Plagiorchiida
Animals described in 1933
Invertebrates of Asia